Mike Reynolds (November 21, 1929 – July 2, 2022) was an American voice actor and writer.

Career 
Reynolds had been a voice actor in animation and anime movies since 1973 until 2004, and had also been a screen actor in movies. His most distinctive acting characteristic was his gruff, gravely voice.

He used his voice in the Power Rangers franchise until 2002. Two of his best-known roles are the voice of General Ivar in VR Troopers, Captain Mutiny in Power Rangers: Lost Galaxy, and Gennai from the American English dub of Digimon Adventure. Reynolds has also made appearances on Larry David's show Curb Your Enthusiasm.

Dubbing roles

Anime dubbing
 8 Man After - Chief Tanaka
 Aesop's Fables - The North Wind
 Akira - Mr. Nezu (Animaze dub)
 Aladdin and the Magic Lamp - The Genie of the Ring (Samuel Goldwyn Co. dub version)
 Appleseed - Elder
 Arc the Lad - Bibiga
 Armitage III - Lt. Larry Randolph
 Around the World with Willy Fog - Additional Voices
 Attack of the Super Monsters - Emperor Tyrannus, Styracosaurus
 Barefoot Gen - Various (Streamline dub)
 Bastard!! - Various
 The Big O - Sven Marisky
 Biohunter - Bokudoh
 Button Nose - King Krumpet
 Call of the Wild: Howl Buck - John Thornton
 Carried by the Wind: Tsukikage Ran - Kikuhimeya Housemaster
 Casshan: Robot Hunter - Various
 The Castle of Cagliostro - Groundskeeper, German Councilmember (Streamline version)
 Cowboy Bebop - Van
 Cowboy Bebop: The Movie - Colonel
 Crimson Wolf - Yen Pao Lin
 Crying Freeman - Brainwasher, Jigon, Master Naitai (Streamline dub)
 Cyborg 009 The Cyborg Soldier - Dr. Kozumi, Poseidon
 Demetan Croaker, The Boy Frog - Various
 Digimon Adventure/Digimon Adventure 02 - Old Gennai
 Digimon: The Movie - Gennai
 DNA Sights 999.9 - Professor Shimaoka
 Dogtanian and the Three Muskehounds - Widimer
 Doomed Megalopolis - Yamumasa Hirai
 Dragon Ball - King Gurumes (Harmony Gold dub)
 Dragon Slayer - Rias
 El Hazard: The Wanderers - Village Chief
 Fist of the North Star - Gojiba, Lynn's Captor
 Gatchaman - Braddock
 Ghost in the Shell - Minister (as Hank Smith)
 Ghost in the Shell: Stand Alone Complex - Chief Nibu, Justice Minister
 Ghost in the Shell: Stand Alone Complex 2nd Gig - Commissioner-General
 Golgo 13: The Professional - Lt. Bob Bragan
 Grimm's Fairy Tale Classics - Various
 Hello Carbot - Storm
 Honeybee Hutch - Additional Voices
 Kiki's Delivery Service - Hometown Adult 1, Ket's Grandmother (Streamline dub)
 Kyofu Densetsu: Kaiki! Furankenshutain - Grandfather
 Laputa: Castle in the Sky - General (original English dub) (as Mark Richards)
 Lensman - Gary Kinnison
 Lensman: Secret of the Lens - Admiral Haynes (Harmony Gold dub), Ken (Streamline dub)
 Lily C.A.T. - Captain Mike Hamilton
 Mars Daybreak - Various
 Maple Town - Various
 Mirage of Blaze - Various
 Mon Colle Knights - Centaur King
 Noozles - Additional Voices
 Ninja Robots - Grathan Gryn
 Outlaw Star - Old Man
 The Professional - Lt. Bob Bragan
 Raijin-Oh - Secretary of Defense
 Robotech - Dolza, Senator Russo
 Robotech: The Untold Story - Various
 Rurouni Kenshin - Takuma Hashizume
 Saint Tail - Butler, Mayor
 Samurai X - Okina
 The Sea Prince and the Fire Child - Aristurtle
 The Story of Fifteen Boys - Walston
 Street Fighter II V - Interpol Chief
 Street Fighter II: The Movie - Minister Sellers
 Tales of Little Women - James Lawrence
 Tekkaman Blade - Galt
 Transformers: Robots in Disguise - Railspike
 Wicked City - Giuseppe Maiyart
 Wild Arms: Twilight Venom - Babo
 Wolf's Rain - Lord Orkham
 Wowser - Additional Voices
 Zillion - Big Scout, Minister

Filmography

Animation
 Creepy Crawlers - Additional Voices
 Journey to the Heart of the World - Professor Fortier
 The Little Train - Il Trenino Del Pianeta Favola (Harmony Gold English dub) - The Big Bad Wolf
 The Legend of the Titanic - Duke of Camden (uncredited)
 The Treasure Planet - Billy Bones
 The Smurfs and the Magic Flute - Matthew McCreep
Peter-No-Tail in Americat - Old Bearcat
 Walter Melon - Various
 The Wisdom of The Gnomes - Additional Voices
 Captain Of The Forest (Az erdő kapitánya) - Captain Schnauzer

Live-action voice-over
 Power Rangers Wild Force - Ship Org
 Power Rangers Time Force - Mr. Mechanau (mutant form)
 Power Rangers Lost Galaxy - Captain Mutiny
 Power Rangers in Space - Destructipede (uncredited)
 Big Bad Beetleborgs - Terror Bear
 VR Troopers - General Ivar
 Mighty Morphin Power Rangers - Pineoctopus, Spit Flower, Key Keeper, Scatterbrain, Mondo the Magician, Lanterra (uncredited)
 Cinema Paradiso - Alfredo
 Masked Rider - Masked Rider Warrior Commander, Masked Rider Strongman

Video games
Star Trek: 25th Anniversary Enhanced (1992) Ies Bredell
Star Trek: Judgment Rites (1993) Ies Bredell

Television
 The A-Team - Don Sharp (Episode: The Road to Hope)
 Curb Your Enthusiasm - Angry Laker Fan (Episode: Shaq), Waiter (Episode: The Thong)
 The New Twilight Zone - Driver (Episode: Paladin of the Lost Hour)

Film
Harry in Your Pocket (1973) Man in Train Station
Stacy's Knights (1983) Shecky Poole
Young Lady Chatterley II (1985) Howard Beechum III
Bad Guys (1986) Repo Man
Off the Mark (1987) Doctor
Night Life (1989) Policeman #5
Tornado Run (1995) Norman Borden
Who's the Caboose? (1997) Susan's Landlord

Staff work

Writer
 The Adventures of Huckleberry Finn
 The Adventures of Tom Sawyer
 Bob in a Bottle
 Bleach
 Bumpety Boo
 Codename: Robotech
 Creepy Crawlers
 Destiny of The Shrine Maidens
 Digimon Adventure
 Gad Guard
 Grimm's Fairy Tale Classics
 Hallo Spencer
 Heat Guy J
 Jin Jin and the Panda Patrol
 Jungle de Ikou!
 Jungle Tales
 The Littl' Bits
 Little Train (Also acts)
 Magic Knight Rayearth
 Maple Town
 Maya the Bee
 Mirage of Blaze
 Ninja Robots
 Noozles
 Ox Tales
 Planetes
 Tales of Little Women (also acts)
 The Return of Dogtanian
 Robotech
 Saban's Adventures of the Little Mermaid
 Saban's Adventures of Peter Pan
 Saban's Adventures of Pinocchio
 Samurai Pizza Cats
 Sandokan
 Steel inferno
 Stellvia
 Tenko and the Guardians of the Magic
 The Wisdom of The Gnomes
 Wowser

Miscellaneous crew
 Codename: Robotech - Dialogue Director
 Robotech - Dialogue Director
 Space Pirate Captain Harlock - Reversioning & Dialogue
 White Fang - ADR Loop Group

References

External links

1929 births
2022 deaths
Place of birth missing
American male television actors
American male voice actors
American television writers
American male television writers
American voice directors